Olszyna  is a town in Lubań County, Lower Silesian Voivodeship, in south-western Poland. Its name means "alder wood" in Polish. It is the seat of the administrative district (gmina) called Gmina Olszyna. A settlement dating back to the Middle Ages, it received its town charter in 2005.

As of 2019, the town has a population of 4,348.

References

External links
Official town webpage

Cities and towns in Lower Silesian Voivodeship
Lubań County
Cities in Silesia
Czech Republic–Poland border crossings